Ginnerup, is a small settlement in Denmark, located in north eastern Jutland. It is located around 10 km west of Grenå. It is a part of Norddjurs Municipality in Region Midtjylland.

Notable people 

 Anders Fogh Rasmussen (born 1953 in Ginnerup) a Danish politician, 24th Prime Minister of Denmark 2001 to 2009 and 12th Secretary General of NATO 2009 to October 2014

Villages in Denmark
Populated places in Central Denmark Region
Norddjurs Municipality